The rundstück warm (English: "round stick [piece] warm") is a hot dish consisting of a slice of warm roast beef or pork served between the slices of a halved round wheat roll, which is then doused with hot gravy. It is sometimes served with mustard and side dishes such as pickles or aspic from the roast stock.

History
The original bread roll of Hamburg is called "Rundstück" (lit.: round stick, but often in German, stück can mean bit or piece, so round piece [of meat] gets at the meaning).  Those that were not eaten for breakfast were plated with slices of roasted pork, smothered in sauce and were then called "Rundstück warm". Earlier versions of the dish typically only included a bread roll underneath the meat.

It has been described as being "centuries old". It has been posited by some historians that the dish originated in Hamburg in the 17th century, when the round roll began to be purveyed in Hamburg. Following this, leftover pork and gravy from Sunday roasts were used to prepare the dish on Mondays.

It has been suggested that the rundstück warm may be a precursor to the hamburger, but ultimately, "food historians disagree on the modern burger’s origins". Some historians argue that the hamburger descends from the rundstück warm, while others believe that the hamburger originates from somewhere else.

It was a popular snack food in the early 20th century in Hamburg.

See also

 Cuisine of Hamburg
 List of meat dishes

References

Further reading
 
 Dieck, Tom (2013). Pottkieker. 50 classic North German dishes with history. Koehler, Hamburg 2013. . pp. 52–53.

External links
 Hamburger Rundstück warm. Wesfood. 

Hamburg cuisine
Beef dishes
Pork dishes
Fast food